Science of Logic (SL; , WdL), first published between 1812 and 1816, is the work in which Georg Wilhelm Friedrich Hegel outlined his vision of logic. Hegel's logic is a system of dialectics, i.e., a dialectical metaphysics: it is a development of the principle that thought and being constitute a single and active unity. Science of Logic also incorporates the traditional Aristotelian syllogism: It is conceived as a phase of the "original unity of thought and being" rather than as a detached, formal instrument of inference.

For Hegel, the most important achievement of German idealism, starting with Immanuel Kant and culminating in his own philosophy, was the argument that reality (being) is shaped through and through by thought and is, in a strong sense, identical to thought. Thus ultimately the structures of thought and being, subject and object, are identical. Since for Hegel the underlying structure of all of reality is ultimately rational, logic is not merely about reasoning or argument but rather is also the rational, structural core of all of reality and every dimension of it. Thus Hegel's Science of Logic includes among other things analyses of being, nothingness, becoming, existence, reality, essence, reflection, concept, and method. As developed, it included the fullest description of his dialectic.

Hegel considered it one of his major works and therefore kept it up to date through revision.

Science of Logic is sometimes referred to as the Greater Logic to distinguish it from the Lesser Logic, the moniker given to the condensed version Hegel presented as the "Logic" section of his Encyclopedia of the Philosophical Sciences.

Publication history 

Hegel wrote Science of Logic after he had completed his Phenomenology of Spirit and while he was in Nuremberg working at a secondary school and courting his fiancée. It was published in two volumes. The first, ‘The Objective Logic’, has two parts (the Doctrines of Being and Essence) and each part was published in 1812 and 1813 respectively. The second volume, ‘The Subjective Logic’, was published in 1816 the same year he became a professor of philosophy at Heidelberg. Science of Logic is too advanced for undergraduate students so Hegel wrote an Encyclopaedic version of the logic which was published in 1817.

In 1826, the book went out of stock. Instead of reprinting, as requested, Hegel undertook some revisions. By 1831, Hegel completed a greatly revised and expanded version of the ‘Doctrine of Being’, but had no time to revise the rest of the book. The Preface to the second edition is dated 7 November 1831, just before his death on 14 November 1831. This edition appeared in 1832, and again in 1834–5 in the posthumous Works. Only the second edition of Science of Logic is translated into English.

Introduction

Hegel's general concept of logic
According to Hegel, logic is the form taken by the science of thinking in general. He thought that, as it had hitherto been practiced, this science demanded a total and radical reformulation "from a higher standpoint." At the end of the preface he wrote that "Logic is the thinking of God." His stated goal with The Science of Logic was to overcome what he perceived to be a common flaw running through all other former systems of logic, namely that they all presupposed a complete separation between the content of cognition (the world of objects, held to be entirely independent of thought for their existence), and the form of cognition (the thoughts about these objects, which by themselves are pliable, indeterminate and entirely dependent upon their conformity to the world of objects to be thought of as in any way true). This unbridgeable gap found within the science of reason was, in his view, a carryover from everyday, phenomenal, unphilosophical consciousness.

The task of extinguishing this opposition within consciousness Hegel believed he had already accomplished in his book Phänomenologie des Geistes (1807) with the final attainment of Absolute Knowing: "Absolute knowing is the truth of every mode of consciousness because ... it is only in absolute knowing that the separation of the object from the certainty of itself is completely eliminated: truth is now equated with certainty and certainty with truth." Once thus liberated from duality, the science of thinking no longer requires an object or a matter outside of itself to act as a touchstone for its truth, but rather takes the form of its own self-mediated exposition and development which eventually comprises within itself every possible mode of rational thinking. "It can therefore be said," says Hegel, "that this content is the exposition of God as he is in his eternal essence before the creation of nature and a finite mind." The German word Hegel employed to denote this post-dualist form of consciousness was Begriff (traditionally translated either as Concept or Notion).

General division of the Logic
The self-exposition of the concept (also translated as notion), follows a series of necessary, self-determined stages in an inherently logical, dialectical progression. Its course is from the objective to the subjective "sides" (or judgements as Hegel calls them) of the concept. The objective side, its Being, is the concept as it is in itself [an sich], its reflection in nature being found in anything inorganic such as water or a rock. This is the subject of Book One: The Doctrine of Being. Book Three: The Doctrine of the concept outlines the subjective side of the concept as concept, or, the concept as it is for itself [für sich]; human beings, animals and plants being some of the shapes it takes in nature. The process of Being's transition to the concept as fully aware of itself is outlined in Book Two: The Doctrine of Essence, which is included in the Objective division of the Logic. The Science of Logic is thus divided like this:
 Volume One: The Objective Logic
 Book One: The Doctrine of Being
 Book Two: The Doctrine of Essence
 Volume Two: The Subjective Logic
 Book Three: The Doctrine of the Concept

This division, however, does not represent a strictly linear progression. At the end of the book Hegel wraps all of the preceding logical development into a single Absolute Idea. Hegel then links this final absolute idea with the simple concept of Being which he introduced at the start of the book. Hence the Science of Logic is actually a circle and there is no starting point or end, but rather a totality. This totality is itself, however, but a link in the chain of the three sciences of Logic, Nature and Spirit, as developed by Hegel in his Encyclopedia of the Philosophical Sciences (1817), that, when taken as a whole, comprise a "circle of circles."

Objective Logic: Doctrine of Being

Determinate Being (Quality)

Being
A. Being

Being, specifically Pure Being, is the first step taken in the scientific development of Pure Knowing, which itself is the final state achieved in the historical self-manifestation of Geist (Spirit/Mind) as described in detail by Hegel in Phänomenologie des Geistes (1807). This Pure Knowing is simply Knowing as Such, and as such, has for its first thought product Being as Such, i.e., the purest abstraction from all that is (although, importantly, not distinct from, or alongside, all that is), having "no diversity within itself nor with any reference outwards. ... It is pure indeterminateness and emptiness."

B. Nothing

Nothing, specifically Pure Nothing, "is simply equality with itself, complete emptiness, absence of all determination and content." It is therefore identical with Being, except that it is thought of as its very opposite. This distinction is therefore meaningful as posited by thought.

C. Becoming

Pure Being and Pure Nothing are the same, and yet absolutely distinct from each other. This contradiction is resolved by their immediate vanishing, one into the other. Being was always already Nothing, and Nothing was always already Being; Being and Nothing are conceptually identical, yet at the same time nominally distinguished (unterschieden). This vanishing of prior positions is the intrinsic movement of the concept (der Begriff). Conceptual (begrifflich) movement with respect to Being and Nothing is called Becoming, and takes the form of reciprocal Coming-to-Be (Entstehen) and Ceasing-to-Be (Vergehen).

Hegel borrows Kant's example of the "hundred dollars" [Critique of Pure Reason (1787)] to emphasize that the unity of Being and Nothing in Becoming only applies when they are taken in their absolute purity as abstractions. It is of course not a matter of indifference to one's fortune if $100 is or is not, but this is only meaningful if it is presupposed that the one whose fortune it might or might not be, already is, i.e., the $100's being or not must be referenced to an other's. This, then, cannot be Pure Being which by definition has no reference outwards. Heraclitus is cited as the first philosopher to think in terms of Becoming.

Determinate Being

A. Determinate Being as Such

The transition between Becoming and (a) Determinate Being as Such (Dasein) is accomplished by means of sublation. This term, the traditional English translation of the German word aufheben, means to preserve, to maintain, but also to cease, to put an end to. Hegel claims that it is "one of the most important notions in philosophy." Being and Nothing were complete opposites whose inner unity needed to be expressed, or mediated, by a third term: Becoming. Once having been accomplished through mediation, their unity then becomes immediate. Their opposition, still extant in Becoming, has been "put an end to." From the newly acquired standpoint of immediacy, Becoming becomes Determinate Being as Such, within which Being and Nothing are no longer discrete terms, but necessarily linked moments that it has "preserved" within itself. Sublation, then, is the ending of a logical process, yet at the same time it is its beginning again from a new point of view.

So, as moments of Determinate Being, Being and Nothing take on new characteristics as aspects of (b) Quality. Being becomes emphasized, and, as Quality, is Reality; Nothing, or Non-Being, is concealed in Being's background serving only to delimit it as a specific Quality distinct from others, and, in so doing, is Negation in General, i.e., Quality in the form of a deficiency. Quality, then, comprises both what a Determinate Being is and is not, viz., that which makes it determinate in the first place. Within Quality, however, Reality and Negation are still distinct from one another, are still mediated, just like Being and Nothing were in Becoming. Taken in their unity, that is, in their immediacy as, again, sublated, they are now only moments of (c) Something.

Hegel contrasts his logically derived concept of Reality from the earlier metaphysical one present in the ontological "proof" of God's existence, specifically Leibniz’s formulation of it. In this theory, God was held to be the sum-total of all realities. These realities are taken to be "perfections," their totality therefore comprising the most perfect being imaginable: God. Speculative logic, however, shows that Reality is inextricably bound up with its own negation, and so any grand total of these realities would not result in something strictly positive, e.g., God, but would inevitably retain, to an equal degree, the negation of all these realities. The mere addition of realities to each other, then, would not in any way alter their principle, and so the sum of all realities would be no more or less than what each of them already was: a Reality and its Negation.

Something is the first instance in The Science of Logic of the "negation of the negation". The first negation, Negation in General, is simply what a Determinate Being is not. Hegel calls this "abstract negation". When this negation itself is negated, which is called "absolute negation," what a Determinate Being is, is no longer dependent on what it is not for its own determination, but becomes an actual particular Something in its own right: a Being-Within-Self. Its negation, what it is not, is now "cut off" from it and becomes another Something, which, from the first Something's point of view, is an Other in general. Finally, just as Becoming mediated between Being and Nothing, Alteration is now the mediator between Something and Other.

B. Finitude

(a) Something and Other are separate from each other, but each still contains within itself, as moments, their former unity in Determinate Being. These moments now re-emerge as Being-in-Itself, i.e., Something as Something only insofar as it is in opposition to the Other; and Being-for-Other, i.e., Something as Something only insofar as it is in relation to the Other. (Hegel's view is in this way contrasted with Kant's noumenon, the unknowable "thing in itself": Being-in-itself taken in isolation from Being-for-Other is nothing but an empty abstraction and to ask "what it is" is to ask a question made impossible to answer.)

Something is now no longer only an isolated something, but is in both positive and negative relationship to the Other. This relationship, however, is then reflected back into the Something as isolated, i.e., in-itself, and bestows upon it further determinations. What a Something is in opposition to an Other is its (b) Determination; what it is in relation to an Other is its Constitution.

For example, a human being's Determination is thinking reason, since that is what she unalterably is in opposition to her Other: nature. However, humans are entangled in nature in myriad other ways than just thinking rationally about it, and how humans react to this external influence also tells us about what they are. This is their Constitution, the part of their being that undergoes alteration in relation to its Others.

The point at which Something ceases to be itself and becomes an Other is that Something's Limit. This Limit is also shared by its Other which is itself an other Something only insofar as it is on the far side of this Limit. It is therefore by their common Limits that Somethings and Others are mediated with one another and mutually define each other's inner Qualities.

From the perspective of the Limit, a Something is only a particular Something insofar as it is not something else. This means that the Something's self-determination (inherited from Determined Being as Such) is only relative, entirely dependent on what it isn't to be what it is, and entirely dependent on Something posited as the contradiction of itself, of its own Limit. Something is thus only temporary, contains its own Ceasing-to-Be within itself and so is (c) Finite, i.e., doomed to eventually cease to be. For Finite things, "the hour of their birth is the hour of their death." At this point the Limit ceases to play its mediating role between Something and Other, i.e., is negated, and is taken back into the self-identity―the Being-Within-Self―of the Something to become that Something’s Limitation, the point beyond which that Something will cease to be. The flip side of this, though, is that the Limit also takes its negative along with it back into the Something, this (the result of negating the Limit) being the Other yet now as posited in the Something as that Something’s very own Determination.  What this means is that, in the face of its own Limitation, the very Quality that defined the Something in the first place ceases to be in any opposition to the Other, which is to say that it no longer strictly is this Quality but now Ought to be this Quality. Limitation and the Ought are the twin, self-contradictory moments of the Finite.

C. Infinity

The negation that Being-in-Itself experienced in the Limitation, the negation that made it Finite, is again negated resulting in the affirmative determination of (a) the Infinite in General which now reveals itself, not as something distinct from, but as the true nature of the Finite. "At the name of the infinite, the heart and the mind light up, for in the infinite the spirit is not merely abstractly present to itself, but rises to its own self, to the light of thinking, of its universality, of its freedom."

This affirmation of the Infinite, however, carries with it a negative relation to an other, the Finite. Because of this, it falls back into the determination of the Something with a Limit peculiar to itself. This In-finite, then, is not the pure Infinite, but merely the non-Finite. Hegel calls this the Spurious Infinite and it is this that is spoken of whenever the Infinite is held to be over and above―separated from―the Finite. This separateness is in itself false since the Finite naturally engenders the Infinite through Limitation and the Ought, while the Infinite, thus produced, is bounded by its Other, the Finite, and is therefore itself Finite. Yet they are held to be separate by this stage of thought and so the two terms are eternally stuck in an empty oscillation back and forth from one another. This Hegel calls (b) the Infinite Progress.

This impasse can only be overcome, as usual, via sublation. From the standpoint of the Finite, the Infinite cannot break free into independence, but must always be bounded, and therefore finitized, by its Other, the Finite. For further logical development to be possible, this standpoint must shift to a new one where the Infinite is no longer simply a derivation of the Finite, but where the Finite, as well as the Infinite in General, are but moments of (c) the True Infinite. The True infinite bears the same relation of mediation to these moments as Becoming did to Being and Nothing and as Alteration did to Something and Other.

Hegel gives as a symbol of the Infinite Progress the straight line which stretches out to infinity in both directions. This Infinity is, at all times, the beyond of the Determinate Being of the line itself. True Infinity is properly represented by the "circle, the line which has reached itself, which is closed and wholly present, without beginning and end."

This move is highly significative of Hegel's philosophy because it means that, for him, "[it] is not the finite which is the real but the infinite." The reality of the True Infinite is in fact "more real" than the Reality of Determinate Being. This higher, and yet more concrete, reality is the Ideal [das Ideell]: "The idealism of philosophy consists in nothing else than in recognizing that the finite has no veritable being."

As having been sublated, the mediation which was performed by the True Infinite between the Finite and the Infinite now has resulted in their immediate unity. This unity is called Being-for-Self.

Being-for-Self

A. Being-for-Self as Such

At this point we have arrived back at simple Being from which all the previous developments had initially proceeded. This Being, though, is now in the standpoint of Infinity from which these developments can be seen as moments of itself and so it is (a) Being-for-Self as Such. Until this point Determinate Being was burdened with Finitude, depended on the Other for its own determination, and so was only relatively determined Being. From the Ideal standpoint of Infinity, Being-for-Self has become free from this burden and so is absolutely determined Being.

As a consequence of having overcome this relativity, however, both sides of the relationship between Something and Other are now also in equal relation to the Infinite Being that they have become Ideal moments of. So, although through their relationship Something and Other mutually determine each other's inner Qualities, they do not have the same effect on the Infinite Being―be it God, spirit or ego (in the Fichtean sense)―to which they are now objects. This Being is not just another Finite Other, but is the One for which they are and of which they are a part. The Being-for-Other of Finitude has become the (b) Being-for-One of Infinity.

This Being-for-One recalls Leibniz’s monad because it involves a simple oneness that maintains itself throughout the various determinations that might take place within it. Hegel, however, is critical of Leibniz’s construction because, since these monads are indifferent to each other and, strictly speaking, are not Others to one another, they cannot determine each other and so no origin can be found for the harmony that is claimed to exist between them. Being-for-One, containing as it does the moments of determination within it, avoids this contradiction.

If we now take in isolation that to which all the preceding moments refer, i.e., that which we now have immediately before us, we end up with (c) the One.

B. The One and the Many

This (a) One in its Own Self, standing in negative relation to all its preceding moments, is entirely differentiated from each of them. It is neither a Determinate Being, nor a Something, nor a Constitution, etc. It is therefore indeterminate and unalterable. There is Nothing in it. Just as there is no criterion to distinguish Being and Nothing despite the fact that they are opposites, the One is also identical with its opposite, (b) the Void. The Void can be said to be the Quality of the One.

At this stage, the Logic has incorporated the ancient atomism of Leucippus and Democritus. Hegel actually held the ancient philosophical notion of atomism in higher esteem than the scientific one of modern physics because the former understood the void not just as the empty space between atoms, but as the atom’s own inherent principle of unrest and self-movement. "Physics with its molecules and particles suffers from the atom ... just as much as does that theory of the State which starts from the particular will of individuals."

The original transition of Being and Nothing to Determinate Being is again echoed here in the sphere of Being-for-Self. The One, though, as negatively related to all aspects of Quality excepting its own Quality of being the Void, cannot take on a Qualitative determinateness like Determinate Being did. In its own self-differentiation, it can only relate to itself as another self identical to it, that is, as another One. Since no new Quality has been taken on, we cannot call this transition a Becoming, but rather a Repulsion, i.e., the positing of (c) Many Ones.

C. Repulsion and Attraction

Once these many Ones have been posited, the nature of their relationship begins to unfold. Because it is the nature of the One to be purely self-related, their relation to one another is in fact a non-relation, i.e., takes place externally in the Void. From the standpoint of the one One, then, there are no other Ones, that is, its relation to them is one of (a) Exclusion. Seen from within the One there is only one One, but at the same time the One only exists in the first place through its negative external relation to other Ones, i.e., for there to be the one One there must be Many Ones that mutually Exclude one another.

The idea that the One is entirely self-subsistent and can exist without the Many is, according to Hegel, "the supreme, most stubborn error, which takes itself for the highest truth, manifesting in more concrete forms as abstract freedom, pure ego and, further, as Evil."

Now that Many Ones have been posited out of their Repulsion from the One, their original Oneness reasserts itself and their Repulsion passes over to (b) Attraction. Attraction presupposes Repulsion: for the Many to be Attracted by the One, they must have at first been Repulsed by it.

The One having been restored to unity by Attraction now contains Repulsion and Attraction within it as moments. It is the Ideal One of Infinite Being, which, for Hegel, actually makes it more "real" than the merely Real Many. From the standpoint of this Ideal One, both Repulsion and Attraction now presuppose each other, and, taken one step further, each presupposes itself as mediated by the other. The One is only a One with reference to another One―Repulsion; but this "other" One is in itself identical to, is in fact, the original One―Attraction: each is the moment of the other. This is the (c) Relation of Repulsion and Attraction, which at this point is only relative.

Although in Hegel's estimation a triumph of the explanatory power of metaphysics over the physics based on sense perception as it was then practised, he believed that Kant’s Metaphysische Anfangsgründe der Naturwissenschaft [Metaphysical Foundations of Natural Science] (1786) retained many of the errors committed by the latter, foremost among these being that, since matter is given to the senses as already formed and constituted, it is taken to be such by the mind as well. The forces of Attraction and Repulsion that are supposed to act upon matter to set it in motion, then, are not seen also to be the very forces through which matter itself comes into being in the first place.

Repulsion and Attraction are relative to one another insofar as the One is taken either as the beginning or result of their mediation with one another. Imparted with continuous, Infinite motion, the One, Repulsion and Attraction become the sublated moments of Quantity.

Magnitude (Quantity)

Quantity
A. Pure Quantity

The previous determinations of Being-for-Self have now become the sublated moments of Pure Quantity. Pure Quantity is a One, but a One made up of the Many having been Attracted back into each other out of their initial Repulsion. It therefore contains Many identical Ones, but in their coalescence, they have lost their mutual Exclusion, giving us a simple, undifferentiated sameness. This sameness is Continuity, the moment of Attraction within Quantity. The other moment, that of Repulsion, is also retained in Quantity as Discreteness. Discreteness is the expansion of the self-sameness of the Ones into Continuity. What the unity of Continuity and Discreteness, i.e., Quantity, results in is a continual outpouring of something out of itself, a perennial self-production.

"[S]pecific examples of pure quantity, if they are wanted, are space and time, also matter as such, light, and so forth, and the ego itself." Hegel here sharply criticizes Kant's antinomy, put forth in his Critique of Pure Reason, between indivisibility and infinite divisibility in time, space and matter. By taking continuity and discreteness to be entirely antithetical to one another, instead of in their truth which is their dialectical unity, Kant becomes embroiled in self-contradiction.

B. Continuous and Discrete Magnitude

Although unified in Quantity, Continuity and Discreteness still retain their distinction from one another. They cannot be cut off from each other, but either one can be foregrounded leaving the other present only implicitly. Quantity is a Continuous Magnitude when seen as a coherent whole; as a collection of identical Ones, it is a Discrete Magnitude.

C. Limitation of Quantity

Quantity is the One, but containing within it the moments of the Many, Repulsion, Attraction, etc. At this point the negative, Excluding nature of the One is reasserted within Quantity. The Discrete Ones within Quantity now become Limited, isolated Somethings: Quanta.

Quantum

A. Number
The first determination of quantum is Number. Number is made up of a One or Many Ones—which, as quanta, are called Units—each of which is identical to the other. This identity in the Unit constitutes the Continuity of Number. However, a Number is also a specific Determinate Being that encloses an aggregate of Units while excluding from itself other such aggregates. This, the Amount, is the moment of Discreteness within Number. Both Qualitative and Quantitative Determinate Being have Limits that demarcate the boundary between their affirmative presence and their negation, but in the former the Limit determines its Being to be of a specific Quality unique to itself, whereas in the latter, made up as it is of homogeneous Units that remain identical to each other no matter which side of the Limit they fall upon, the Limit serves only to enclose a specific Amount of Units, e.g., a hundred, and to distinguish it from other such aggregates.

The species of calculation—counting, addition/subtraction, multiplication/division, powers/roots—are the different modes of bringing Numbers into relation with each other. Although the progress through these modes displays the same sort of dialectical evolution as does the Logic proper, they are nonetheless entirely external to it because there is no inner necessity in the various arrangements imposed on them by arithmetical procedure. With the expression 7 + 5 = 12, although 5 added to 7 necessarily equals 12, there is nothing internal to the 7 or the 5 themselves that indicates that they should be brought in any sort of relation with one another in the first place. For this reason, number cannot be relied upon to shed any light on strictly philosophical notions, despite the ancient attempt by Pythagoras to do so. It can however be used to symbolize certain philosophical ideas. As for math as a pedagogical tool, Hegel presciently had this to say: "Calculation being so much an external and therefore mechanical process, it has been possible to construct machines which perform arithmetical operations with complete accuracy. A knowledge of just this one fact about the nature of calculation is sufficient for an appraisal of the idea of making calculation the principal means for educating the mind and stretching it on the rack in order to perfect it as a machine."

B. Extensive and Intensive Quantum
Taken in its immediacy, a Number is an Extensive Magnitude, that is, a collection of a certain Amount of self-same Units. These Units, say ten or twenty of them, are the sublated moments of the Extensive Magnitudes ten or twenty. However, the Number ten or twenty, though made up of Many, is also a self-determining One, independent of other Numbers for its determination. Taken in this way, ten or twenty (a) differentiates itself from Extensive Magnitude and becomes an Intensive Magnitude, which is expressed as the tenth or twentieth Degree. Just as the One was completely indifferent to the other Ones of the Many yet depended on them for its existence, each Degree is indifferent to every other Degree, yet they are externally related to one another in ascending or descending flow through a scale of Degrees.

Although thus differentiated from each other, Extensive and Intensive magnitude are essentially (b) the same. "[T]hey are only distinguished by the one having amount within itself and the other having amount outside itself." It is at this point that the moment of the Something reasserts itself having remained implicit over the course of the development of Quantity. This Something, which reappears when the negation between Extensive and Intensive Magnitude is itself negated, is the re-emergence of Quality within the dialectic of Quantity.

 EXAMPLE: Weight exerts a certain pressure which is its Intensive Magnitude. This pressure, however, can be measured Extensively, in pounds, kilograms, etc. Heat or cold can be Qualitatively experienced as different Degrees of temperature, but can also be Extensively measured in a thermometer. High and low Intensities of notes are the results of a greater or smaller Amount of vibrations per unit of time. Finally, "in the spiritual sphere, high intensity of character, of talent or genius, is bound up with a correspondingly far-reaching reality in the outer world, is of widespread influence, touching the real world at many points."

In the realm of Quantity, the relationship between Something and Other lacked any mutual Qualitative Determinateness. A One could only relate to another One identical to itself. Now, however, that Qualitative Determinateness has returned, the Quantum loses its simple self-relation and can relate to itself only through a Qualitative Other that is beyond itself. This Other is another Quantum, of a greater or lesser Amount, which, in turn, immediately points beyond itself to yet an Other Quantum ad infinitum. This is what constitutes the self-propelled (c) Alteration of Quantum.

C. Quantitative Infinity
Although a particular Quantum, of its own inner necessity, points beyond itself, this beyond is necessarily an Other Quantum. This fact, that Quantum eternally repulses itself, yet equally eternally remains Quantum, demonstrates the (a) Concept of Quantitative Infinity, which is the self-related, affirmative opposition between Finitude and Infinity that lies within it. This irresolvable self-contradiction within Quantum yields (b) the Quantitative Infinite Progress. This progress can take place in one of two directions, the greater or the smaller, giving us the so-called "infinitely great" or "infinitely small." That these "infinites" are each the Spurious Quantitative Infinite is evident in the fact that "great" and "small" designate Quanta, whereas the Infinite by definition is not a Quantum.

Hegel here gives several examples of the appearance of the Spurious Quantitative Infinite in philosophy, namely in Kant's notion of the sublime and his categorical imperative, as well as Fichte's infinite ego as outlined in his 'Theory of Science (1810). At bottom of all these ideas, says Hegel, is an absolute opposition that is held to exist between the ego and its other, this latter taking the form, respectively, of art, nature and the non-ego in general. The opposition is supposed to be overcome by the positing of an infinite relation between the two sides, the ego's level of morality, for example, ever increasing in proportion to a decrease in the power of the senses over it. According with the nature of the Spurious Quantitative Infinite, however, it does not matter how great a level the ego raises itself to, the absolute opposition between it and its other is there and everywhere reasserted and the whole process can have no other outcome than a desperate and futile longing.

The Quantitative Infinite negates Quantum, and Quantum in turn negates Infinity. As occurs so often in The Science of Logic, a negation that is itself negated produces a new affirmative standpoint, the formerly negated terms having become the unified moments thereof. This standpoint is (c) the Infinity of Quantum from where it is seen that Infinity, initially the absolute Other of Quantum, essentially belongs to it and in fact determines it as a particular Quality alongside all the other Determinate Beings that had long since been sublated. This particular Quality which distinguishes Quantum from any other Qualitatively Determined Being is in fact the total lack of explicit self-determinateness that differentiated Quantity from Quality in the first place. The repulsion of Quantum from itself out into the beyond of Infinity, is actually a gesture back towards the world of Qualitative Determination, thus bridging once again the two worlds. This gesture is made explicit in the Quantitative Ratio, where two Quanta are brought into relationship with one another in such a way that neither one in itself is self-determined, but in relating to each other, they Qualitatively determine something beyond themselves, e.g., a line or a curve.

Hegel here engages in a lengthy survey of the history and development of the Differential and Integral Calculus, citing the works of Cavalieri, Descartes, Fermat, Barrow, Newton, Leibniz, Euler, Lagrange, Landen, and Carnot. His main point of concern is the compulsion of mathematicians to neglect the infinitesimal differences that result from calculus equations in order to arrive at a coherent result. The inexactitude of this method of procedure results, says Hegel, primarily from their failure to distinguish between Quantum as the Quantity that each individual term of a differential co-efficient represents, and the Qualitative nature of their relationship when in the form of a ratio. "Dx, dy, are no longer quanta, nor are they supposed to signify quanta; it is solely in their relation to each other that they have any meaning, a meaning merely as moments."

The Quantitative Relation

A. The Direct Ratio

A ratio, such as x:y, is a Direct Ratio if both terms of the ratio are delimited by a single Quantum, a constant, k (what Hegel calls in the language of his day the "exponent" of the ratio),

In the Direct Ratio, the previously sublated Quantitative moments of Amount and Unit are retrieved and brought into immediate relation with each other. One side of the ratio, y, is a certain Amount relative to the other side, x, which serves as the Unit whereby this Amount is measured. If the constant is given, then the Quantum on any one side of the ratio could be any Number, and the Number on the other side will automatically be determined. Therefore, the first Number of the ratio completely loses its independent significance and only functions as a determinate Quantum in relation to an other. Formerly, any single Number could simultaneously denote either an Amount or a Unit; now, it must serve exclusively as the one or the other in relation to another Number serving as the opposite. The constant would seem to bring these moments back into unity with each other, but in actuality, it too can serve only as either Amount or Unit. If x is Unit and y Amount, then k is the Amount of such Units,

if x is Amount, then k is the Unit, the amount of which, y, determines it,

As in themselves incomplete in this way, these Quanta serve only as the Qualitative moments of one another.

B. Inverse Ratio

The Inverse Ratio is a ratio, x:y, in which the relation between both sides is expressed in a constant which is their product, i.e.,

or

Whereas formerly with the Direct Ratio, the quotient between the two terms was fixed, in the Inverse Ratio it becomes alterable. Because the Inverse Ratio confines within itself many Direct Ratios, the constant of the former displays itself not merely as a Quantitative, but also as a Qualitative Limit. It is therefore a Qualitative Quantum. The Spurious Infinity/True Infinity dialectic again makes an appearance here as either term of the ratio is only capable of infinitely approximating the ratio's constant, the one increasing in proportion to a decrease in the other, but never actually reaching it (neither x nor y may equal zero). The constant is nonetheless present as a simple Quantum, and is not an eternal beyond, making its self-mediation through the two terms of the ratio an example of True Infinity.

C. The Ratio of Powers

The Ratio of Powers takes the following form:

It is in this form of the Ratio, says Hegel, that "quantum has reached its concept and has completely realized it." In the Direct and Inverse Ratios, the relation between the constant and its variables was not continuous, the former only being a fixed proportionality between them, and the latter relating itself to them only negatively. With the Ratio of Powers, however, this relationship is not simply one of external limitation, but, as a Quantum brought into relationship with itself through the power, it is self-determining Limit. This self-determination constitutes the Quality of the Quantum, and finally demonstrates the full significance of the essential identity of Quality and Quantity. Originally, Quantity differentiated itself from Quality in that it was indifferent to what was external to it, that which it quantified. Now however, in the Ratio of Powers, what it relates itself to externally is determined by its own self, and that which relates externally to its own self has long since been defined as Quality. "But quantity is not only a quality; it is the truth of quality itself." Quantum, having sublated the moment of Quantity that originally defined it and returned to Quality, is now what it is in its truth: Measure.

Measure

Specific Quantity

A. The Specific Quantum

"Measure is the simple relation of the quantum to itself ... ; the quantum is thus qualitative." Previously, Quantum was held to be indifferent to the Quality of that which it quantified. Now, as Measure, Quality and Quantity though still distinct from one another are inseparable and in their unity comprise a specific Determinate Being: "Everything that exists has a magnitude and this magnitude belongs to the nature of the something itself." The indifference of Quantum is retained in Measure insofar as the magnitude of things can increase or decrease without fundamentally altering their Quality, and yet their essential unity nevertheless manifests at the Limit where an alteration in Quantity will bring about a change in Quality.

 EXAMPLE: Aristotle gives the example of a head from which hairs are plucked one by one. Its Quality of being a head of hair remains if only a few hairs are gone, but at a certain point, it undergoes Qualitative Alteration and become a bald head. Although the Quantitative change is gradual, the Qualitative one, oftentimes, is "unexpected". "It is the cunning of the concept to seize on this aspect of a reality where its quality does not seem to come into play; and such is its cunning that the aggrandizement of a State or of a fortune, etc., which leads finally to disaster for the state or for the owner, even appears at first to be their good fortune."

B. Specifying Measure

Insofar as Quantity describes the upper and lower Limits between which a specific Quality can maintain itself, it serves as a (a) Rule. The Rule is an arbitrary external standard or Amount that measures something other than itself. Although it is often tempting to assume so, there is in actuality no object that can serve as a completely universal standard of measurement, i.e., be pure Quantity. Rather, what is involved in measurement is a ratio between two Qualities and their inherent Quantities, the one made to act as the (b) Specifying Measure of the other, this other, however, being itself just as capable of measuring that which it is being measured by.

 EXAMPLE: In the measure of temperature, we take the expansion and contraction of mercury relative to the heat it contains as a Quantitative Rule for the increase or decrease of temperature in general by dividing the range of its change in magnitude into a scale of arithmetical progression. Tempting though it is to believe, this is not the measure of temperature as such, but only the measure of how Quantitative change specifically affects the Quality of mercury. The water or air the mercury thermometer measures has a very different Qualitative relationship to changes in the Quantity of heat which do not necessarily bear any direct relation to mercury’s. Thus, what is actually going on when we take a temperature is a relationship of comparison between two Qualities and their respective natures when exposed to a Quantitative increase or decrease in heat, and not a universal determination by some disembodied, abstract "thing" that is temperature itself.

So long as we arbitrarily use the Quantitative properties of some Quality or other as a Rule to Measure the magnitude of other Qualities, we abstract from it its Qualitative nature. However, once we have established a Quantitative ratio between two or more Qualities, we can give this ratio an independent existence that Quantitatively unites things that are Qualitatively distinct. We can thus take the Qualities of both sides into account, the independent, or Realized, Measure serving as their (c) Relation. This Measure necessarily involves variable magnitudes since the Qualitatively distinct ways in which different things relate to Quantity can only be registered in their respective rates of increase or decrease relative to each other. Further, in order for each side of the ratio to fully reflect the distinctiveness of the Quality it represents, both sides must be Quantitatively self-related, i.e., take the form of powers as in the case of the Ratio of Powers explicated above.

 EXAMPLE: Velocity is the ratio of space’s relation to time:
 
 It is only an intellectual abstraction, though, since it merely serves to measure space by the Rule of time or time by the Rule of space. It supplies no objective standard for the inherent Quantitative relation to each other that pertains to their specific Qualities. The formula for a falling body comes closer,
 
 but here time is still serving as an arbitrary Rule, that is, it is assumed to vary in a simple arithmetical progression. It is the form of motion described by Kepler’s third law of planetary motion that comes closest for Hegel to being a Realized Measure of the relation between the inherent Qualities of space and time:
 

C. Being-for-Self in Measure

Although now united by the Quantitative Ratio, the two or more Qualities thus brought into relation retain their mutual separation as distinct Qualities. For example, even though we can determine the Quantitative relationship between space and time in the example of a falling body, each of them can still be considered on its own, independent of the other. However, if we then take the constant produced by the ratio of the two sides as a self-subsistent Something in its own right, that is, a Being-for-Self, then the two formerly entirely distinct Qualities become its own sublated moments, their very natures now seen to have been in fact derived from this relation of Measure in the first place.

Real Measure

A. The Relation of Self-Subsistent MeasuresReal Measure gives us a new standpoint external to the different Measures being brought into relation with each other, this relation now designating the independent existence of an actual physical Something. This Something gains its Qualitative determination from the Quantitative (a) combination between two Measures immanent in it, i.e., volume and weight. One designates an inner Quality, in this case weight; the other designates an external Quality, in this case volume, the amount of space it takes up. Their combination gives us the ratio of weight to volume which is its specific gravity. The constant that results from this ratio is the inner characteristic Real Measure of the thing in question, but, taking the form as it does of a mere number, a Quantum, this constant is likewise subject to alteration, i.e., addition, subtraction, etc. Unlike mere Quantum, however, the Real Measure of a thing is inwardly determined, and so preserves itself somewhat in alteration. If two material things are combined, the dual Measures of the one are added to those of the other. The degree to which they exhibit self-preservation is registered in the internal Measure—weight in this case—which ends up being equal, after combination, to the sum of the original two Measures; the degree to which they exhibit Qualitative alteration is registered in the external Measure—space in this case—which does not necessarily result in a sum equal to its parts, but often in the case of material substances exhibits a diminution in overall volume.

If we adopt the constant of one specific Real Measure as our Unit, the constants of other Real Measures can be brought into relation to it as Amounts in a (b) series of Measure relations. Since it is arbitrary which one Real Measure in such a series will serve as the Unit, there are as many incommensurable series of Measure relations as there are individual Real Measures. However, when two Real Measures, which are themselves ratios, are combined, the result is a new ratio of those ratios, itself designated by a constant in the form of a Quantum. If this constant is adopted as the Unit, instead of an individual Real Measure, then what were two incommensurable series are now made commensurable with each other in a common denominator. Since each Real Measure within a series forms such a constant with every other member in that series, any individual series in which a particular Real Measure serves as the Unit can be made commensurable with any other series with a different Real Measure as Unit. Since it is a thing’s Real Measure that determines its specific Quality, and since that Real Measure is in turn derived from the Quantitative relation it has with other Real Measures in the form of a series of constants, it would appear that, as in Determinate Being above, Quality is only relative and externally determined. However, as we have seen, a Real Measure also has an internal relation that gives it a self-subsistence that is indifferent to any external relation. Therefore, the series of Quantitative relationships between these Real Measures only determines the (c) Elective Affinity between their different Qualities, but not these Qualities themselves.

The Quantity/Quality dialectic manifests itself in the realm of Elective Affinity in that a Real Measure within in a series will not necessarily resonate Qualitatively with those in another series even if they bear a proportional Quantitative relationship. In fact, the specific Quality of a particular Real Measure is in part registered by the other Real Measures it has a special Affinity for, that is, how it responds to Quantitative Alteration. It is the Intensive side of Quantity (see above) such as it relates to specific Real Measures that determines its Qualitative behaviour when subject to changes in Extensive Quantity.

 EXAMPLE: Hegel makes it clear that the above analysis applies to the system of chemical affinities and that of musical harmony. In the case of the latter, for example, each individual note is a Real, self-subsistent Measure, consisting as it does of a specific internal ratio between, say, the length and thickness of a guitar string. An individual note, however, only achieves meaning in its relation to a system of other notes that are brought into Quantitative relation to each other through a specific note that serves as the Unit, or key. A note serving as the key in one system, is equally an individual member in other systems in which other notes play this role. Notes that harmonize when played together are demonstrating their Elective Affinity for one another, that is, the higher Qualitative unity that results from a combination in which each individual note nevertheless retains its self-subsistence.

B. Nodal Line of Measure-Relations

The relation of Elective Affinity is an external relation between two Real Measures that is determined by their Quantitative aspects. In and of themselves, each Real Measure retains its Qualitative indifference to all others, even those it has Affinity for. Real Measures, however, are also subject to internal alteration akin to what has already been discussed in "Measure" above, i.e., that its Quality can be maintained only within a certain Quantitative range beyond which it undergoes a sudden "leap" into another Quality. These different Qualities form Nodes on a line of gradual Quantitative increase or decrease.

 EXAMPLE: Natural numbers consist of a series of numbers that gradually increase by one in perpetual succession. However, some of these numbers relate in specific ways to others, being their multiple, power or root, etc., and thus constitute "Nodes." Transition from the liquid to the frozen state in water does not occur gradually with a diminution of temperature, but all of a sudden at 0°C. Finally, the "state has its own measure of magnitude and when this is exceeded this mere change in size renders it liable to instability and disruption under that same constitution which was its good fortune and its strength before its expansion." Thus, contrary to Aristotle’s doctrine that natura non facit saltum, according to Hegel nature does make leaps.

C. The Measureless
Measure, being the unity of Quality and Quantity, now transitions into its version of the Infinite, the Measureless, which accordingly is the unity of the Qualitative and Quantitative Infinites. In the Measureless, the Quantitative Infinite is manifested in the potential of the Nodal line to increase endlessly; the Qualitative Infinite is manifested as the eternal beyond of any particular Qualitative determination. Seeing as the successive determinations are self-generated by an internal Quantitative Alteration of Measure, they can now be seen, from the standpoint of the Measureless, to be different States of one and the same Substrate. The nature of the Substrate is not tied, like the Something was, to a merely external Qualitative appearance, but represents the underlying unity of a variety of internally determined appearances, which are its States.

The Becoming of Essence

A. Absolute Indifference

This Substrate, as what persists through the succession of States, is in a relation of Absolute Indifference to every particular determination—be it of quality, quantity or measure—that it contains. It is merely the abstract expression of the unity that underlies their totality.

B. Indifference as Inverse Ratio of its Factors

Taken in its immediacy, this Indifference is simply the result of all the different determinatenesses that emerge within it. It itself does not determine its own inner fluctuations, i.e., is not self-determining. However, in accordance with the measure relations developed so far, each of its moments are in reciprocal, quantitatively determined ratios with one another. Formerly, from the standpoint of Quality, a sufficient Quantitative increase or decrease would result in a sudden transition from one Quality to another. Now, with Absolute Indifference as our standpoint, every possible Qualitative determination is already implicitly related to every other by means of a Quantitative ratio. Every Quality is connected to, and in equilibrium with, its corresponding other. It is therefore no longer meaningful to say that something can have "more" or "less" of one Quality than another as if each Quality were absolutely distinct from each other. Whatever Quality there is "more" of in one thing than another can be equally said to be a "less" of whatever Quality exists in its stead in the other, i.e., there is an Inverse Ratio of their Factors. So, with a so-called "Quantitative" change, "one factor becomes preponderant as the other diminishes with accelerated velocity and is overpowered by the first, which therefore constitutes itself the sole self-subsistent Quality." The two Qualities are no longer distinct, mutually exclusive determinations, but together comprise a single whole.

 EXAMPLE: Here, Hegel makes a powerful argument in favour of the explanatory powers of his speculative philosophy over those of empirical science, specifically with regards to the concepts of centripetal and centrifugal forces as they are supposed to relate the elliptical motion of celestial bodies. If, as is supposed by science, such an orbit is made up of an inverse relation of centripetal and centrifugal forces—the former predominating over the other as the body approaches perihelion, the reverse if approaching aphelion—then the sudden overtaking of the stronger force by the weaker that takes place on either end of the orbit can only be explained by some mysterious third force. Indeed, what is to stop the dominant force from completely overtaking the weaker, causing the body either to crash into whatever it is orbiting or to fly off at ever accelerating speeds into space? Only the inherent unity of the two Qualities, centripetal and centrifugal, arrived at by the ascension of thought to Absolute Indifference, can adequately explain the Notion of the elliptical orbit, says Hegel.

C. Transition into Essence

Strictly within the realm of Being, the underlying unity behind all its determinations necessarily stands externally, and in contradiction, to those determinations themselves. The transition to Essence occurs when these determinations reabsorb this unity back into themselves, i.e., they sublate it. The inherent contradiction between difference and unity is resolved when the latter is posited as the negative of the former. So, from henceforth it cannot be said that they simply emerge within the Substrate of Indifference, but that this "substrate" itself is their very own living self-relation. In other words, the differences between all the determinations of Being, namely the Quantitative difference and the inverse ratio of factors, are no longer self-subsistent, but in fact are mere moments in the expression of the implicit unity that rules them and, themselves, "are only through their repulsion from themselves." Being has finally determined itself to no longer be simply affirmative Being, i.e., that which characterized Being as Being in the first place, but as a relation with itself, as Being-With-Self, or Essence.

Objective Logic: Doctrine of Essence

Reflection-Within-Self

Illusory Being

A. The Essential and the Unessential

The immediate characteristic displayed by Essence, once it finally emerges from Being, is simply that it is not Being. This apparently puts us back into the sphere of Determinate Being (see above), where each side of a relation mutually determined the Other side as being not what it is. In this immediate, merely relative relation, Essence and Being thus become the Essential and the Unessential, respectively. There is nothing arising within this relation, however, to tell us what it is about something that is Essential and what Unessential. Those that apply this mode of thinking to something are making an arbitrary distinction, the opposite of which could always be claimed with equal justification. What saves Essence from falling back into the relativism of Determinate Being is the very radical and absolute distinction from Being that defines it as Essence in the first place. Being cannot therefore simply preserve itself as an Other relative to Essence, but, having been sublated by Essence, it has for that very reason itself become nothingness, a non-essence, Illusory Being.

B. Illusory Being

So in its relation to Essence, Being has lost its being, has become Illusory. All the determinations of Being covered in the first third of the Science of Logic are no longer self-subsistent, but only "are" at all as negations of Essence. This total dependence on Essence means that there is nothing any longer in Being itself upon which any of its own determinations can be based, i.e., there is no longer any mediation within Being. This role is entirely taken up by Essence which is pure mediation relative to Illusory Being's pure immediacy. Hegel claims this is the mode of thought that corresponds to ancient skepticism as well as the "modern" idealism of Leibniz, Kant, and Fichte. Illusory Being, though not Essence itself, nevertheless belongs entirely to Essence. It is that through which Essence generates itself as what it is, namely, the purely negative as regards Being. The constant appearance and disappearance of the empty manifestations of Illusory Being can now be seen as Essence's own self-generating movement, its own Reflection.

C. Reflection

Reflection in the sphere of Essence corresponds to Becoming in the sphere of Being. However, in Being, this movement was between a positive—pure Being—and a negative—pure Nothingness. Here however, the two terms are Illusory Being and Essence. Illusory Being, as has already been established, is a nullity, nothingness. Essence, by definition, is non-being, absolute negativity. So Reflection, the movement between them, is the movement of nothing to nothing and so back to itself. Both these terms, in being absolutely negative, are identical to one another: Essence is Illusory Being and Illusory Being is Essence. They are, however, also relatively negative, in that the one is, by definition, not what the other is. This contradiction manifests in Essence in that it presupposes or posits, on its own, that which it immediately differentiates itself from: Illusory Being. This absolute recoil upon itself is Essence as a) Positing Reflection.

The next determination of Reflection, b) External Reflection, shifts the emphasis from the absolute negativity, or nothingness, in which the posited Illusory Being and its positing Essence find their identity, to the relative negativity upon which their opposition is based. Although it "knows" that the Illusory Being it finds immediately before it has been posited by none other than itself, External Reflection nevertheless regards this Being as something external to it from which it returns to itself. What concerns it, therefore, is no longer the act of positing itself, but the specific determinateness of that which is posited, since it is this and nothing else that establishes its externality in the first place.

Hegel offers for comparison with his notion of External Reflection the "reflective judgement" of Kant, which, in the Critique of Judgement, is described as the faculty of the mind that determines the universals that lie behind immediately given particulars. This action is similar to that of External Reflection with the crucial difference that, for Hegel, the universal does not simply lie "behind" the particular, but generates the particular from itself and so is the particular's own true Essence. The immediate particular upon which Kant's judgement works is, in actuality, simply a nothingness posited by Reflection itself solely in order to generate its equally null universal, Essence.

With Positing Reflection, the Illusory Being that was posited was only a means for Essence's mediation with itself. Now, with c) Determining Reflection, not only is the moment of Illusory Being foregrounded again, but the specific determinations of this Being come into play as well. The absolute nothingness of Essence forms the background to any and all of the determinations it chooses to Reflect itself off of. These Determinations of Reflection—formerly known as Determinate Beings when they were in the realm of Quality (see above)—therefore share in the nullity that undergirds them. This nullity actually serves to fix them eternally in their specific determination and preserve them from Alteration, because they no longer relate to each other externally as Others to one another, but internally as equals in Essence's nothingness. All the possible determinations of Being are thus preserved negatively in Essence as free Essentialities "floating in the void without attracting or repelling one another."

The Essentialities

A. Identity

In the sphere of Being, above, Qualities were determined only relatively. What something was, was determined entirely by that which differentiated it from what it wasn't, i.e., it was negatively determined by its Other. Here in Essence however, the negativity necessary to establish determination is no longer directed outward, towards an Other, but inward. This is because Essence is in itself absolute negativity, nothingness, and it follows that any determination made therein will share in this negativity and itself be essentially nothing. Therefore, an Essentiality, as opposed to a Quality, is essentially the same as its other—they are both essentially nothing. As self-determining, whatever determination Essence takes on is freely self-generated, it "is what it is," and so is simple Identity-with-self. This absolute Identity rests on the absolute negativity that unites Essence with its Essentialities. However, if we recall from "Reflection" above, Essence is also negative relative to its Essentialities. The Essentialities are determined Essence and, as we know, determination by definition involves negation. Therefore, while the Essentialities are absolutely Identical in their shared nothingness, their absolute negativity, they are equally absolutely Different in their determinations, their relative negativity.

Here Hegel embarks on a critique on one of the most basic assumptions of classical logic, the Law of Identity, usually expressed as A=A. Although superficially the immediate truth of this proposition cannot be denied, further reflection reveals that nothing absolute can be derived from it. For it can only hold true provisionally insofar as A is different from not-A. The Law of Identity, the purpose of which is to draw an absolute distinction between identity and difference, therefore contains difference as a necessary moment implicitly within it. The paucity of the absolute truth it is meant to represent becomes very clear when applied empirically. "If ... to the question 'what is a plant?' the answer is given 'A plant is—a plant', the truth of such a statement is at once admitted by the entire company on whom it is tested, and at the same time it is equally unanimously declared that the statement says nothing."

B. Difference

The Difference of Reflection must be distinguished from the Otherness of Determinate Being. The latter is a relative relation between two Determinate Beings whereby they distinguish themselves one from another and in turn determine themselves as specific Beings based on this distinction. In the sphere of Reflection, however, any determination posited by Essence is, as a determination, necessarily Different from the absolute negativity that is its Essence. The Difference of Reflection, therefore, is different in relation to its own self, and so it is not relative but a) Absolute Difference.

Absolute Difference contains both Difference and Identity within it as moments just as, conversely, Identity contains itself and Difference as its moments. The relation between Identity and Difference takes the form of one term reflecting off the other back into itself: Difference off of Identity back into itself or Identity off of Difference back into itself. "This is to be considered as the essential nature of reflection and as the specific, original ground of all activity and self-movement." Because each of these two moments are self-related in this way, they do not mutually determine one another. Instead, they are indifferent to one another. Therefore, Difference is b) Diversity.

Yet another duality emerges at this point. As moments, Identity and Difference require each other and are bound up with one another: one term could not exist without the other. But at the same time, they absolutely negate one another and only are at all by virtue of their mutual negation of each other. So if we are an external party concerned with a specific determination of Identity, the moment of Difference, though intrinsic to the fact of this Identity, is very far from our minds. That it is Different from other things does not concern us or it at the moment: it is implicit. The category of Identity itself, however, is not determined by whatever it is that it is applied to, but by its reflection off of Difference back into itself. So if, from our external standpoint, that which comprises the Identity of something cannot be established without a Comparison of Likeness with something else. What specifically is Different about something can similarly only be determined by a Comparison of Unlikeness between it and something else. Like and Unlike, being external to the things they refer to, can each be equally applied to one and the same Determination. Things are Like each other insofar as they are not Unlike each other and vice versa: the two terms are mutually exclusive insofar as they refer to the same thing, but in themselves, apart from the things they refer to, there is no difference between them. Since any aspect may be externally selected to demonstrate the Likeness and Unlikeness of any two things, these terms really only refer, not intrinsically to their objects, but to themselves only and, as likewise self-referred, are indistinguishable from each other independent of their objects. Likeness and Unlikeness are both in fact only Likeness. The internal union that existed between Identity and Difference which is merely implicit to the outside observer, therefore emerges again in external reflection between Likeness and Unlikeness, and thus overcomes the external Diversity that held Identity and Difference indifferently apart from each other. This reconstituted unity that thus comes out of Diversity is c) Opposition.

The hidden, internal unity that bound the two moments of Identity and Difference together despite their apparent mutual indifference becomes explicit once they are mediated from the outside by Likeness and Unlikeness. They are no longer indifferent to one another but relate to each other intrinsically as Opposites. A given determination, as seen from its Positive aspect, is Likeness reflected back onto itself off of Unlikeness. Seen from its Negative aspect, it is Unlikeness reflected back onto itself off of Likeness. These two aspects, however, are the constitutive moments of one and the same overall determination. Although as a whole, the Positive and Negative comprise a unity, the Positive on its own is also a self-subsistent being, as is the Negative on its own. Because of this, the Negative can equally well be regarded as positive and vice versa. They are not Positive and Negative merely in comparison with one another, but each contains within itself the other as an essential element of its own determination.

 EXAMPLE: "An hour's journey to the east and the same distance traveled back to the west, cancels the first journey. ... At the same time, the hour's journey to the east is not in itself the positive direction, nor is the journey west the negative direction; ... it is a third point of view outside them that makes one positive and the other negative. ... [T]he distance covered is only one distance, not two, one going east and the other going west." But at the same time, "the distance traveled east and west is the sum of a twofold effort or the sum of two periods of time."

C. Contradiction

Both the Positive and the Negative are self-subsistent determinations: each side can stand on its own without explicit reference to the other. At the same time, however, they completely exclude one another and in fact rely on this exclusion for their self-subsistence. In that sense, the Positive itself is constituted by the very Negative that it excludes; it is based on this exclusion and thus contains what it excludes it within itself. Ditto the Negative. This inclusion of what is excluded is what constitutes the Positive and the Negative as what they are. This is Contradiction. (In the Negative, this self- contradiction is explicit, but it is no less the nature of the Positive.)

So, similar to Becoming above, the Positive and the Negative immediately transition the one into the other: the Positive includes the Negative which immediately excludes the Positive; the resulting Negative however also includes the Positive which in turn excludes the Negative and so on ad infinitum. This mutual inclusion and exclusion cancels out the both of them. This results in nullity. Out of this nullity, the unity of the two sides is restored in the following way. As stated above, both the Positive and the Negative are each self-subsistent on their own, but it is a self-subsistence that is immediately obliterated by the other's. Now, however, arising out of their mutual destruction comes a self-subsistence that is common to the both of them. Instead of merely excluding each other, each side sublates the other, meaning that whatever is posited as Positive is at the same time equally the Negative of its Negative, and whatever is Negative is at the same time equally a Positive. The two sides posit and negate each other simultaneously, and in doing so they no longer destroy each other, but preserve one another. Therefore, the Positive and Negative are in fact the same and this, their sameness—which nevertheless includes their Contradiction—is their Essence as Ground.

EXAMPLE: Light is usually reckoned as purely Positive and dark, purely Negative: the absence of light. However, it is not inherent to these terms that they should be so. Darkness can be taken to be a Positive in its own right "as the non-self-differentiating womb of generation" and vice versa. Furthermore, although they are usually defined as being mutually exclusive, the one being the absence of the other, there is a quantitative spectrum of grey and a qualitative spectrum of colour which exist between the one extreme and the other. The Ground would be a concept of "light" which includes all of the above.

Ground

Simply put ground is the "essence of essence," which for Hegel arguably means the lowest, broadest rung in his ontology because ground appears to fundamentally support his system. Hegel says, for example, that ground is "that from which phenomena is understood." Within ground Hegel brings together such basic constituents of reality as form, matter, essence, content, relation, and condition. The chapter on ground concludes by describing how these elements, properly conditioned, ultimately will bring a fact into existence (a segue to the subsequent chapter on existence).

Hegel considers form to be the focal point of "absolute ground," saying that form is the "completed whole of reflection." Broken into components, form taken together with essence gives us "a substrate for the ground relation" (Hegel seems to mean relation in a quasi-universal sense). When we combine form with matter the result is "determinate matter." Hegel thinks that matter itself "cannot be seen": only a determination of matter resulting from a specific form can be seen. Thus the only way to see matter is by combining matter with form. Finally, content is the unity of form and determinate matter. Content is what we perceive.

"Determinate ground" consists of "formal ground," "real ground," and "complete ground." Remember with Hegel that when we classify something as determinate we are not referring to absolute abstractions (as in absolute ground, above) but now (with determinate ground) have some values attached to some variables—or to put it in Hegel's terminology, ground is now "posited and derived" with "determinate content."

In formal ground, Hegel seems to be referring to those causal explanations of some phenomena that make it what it is. In a (uncharacteristically) readable three paragraph remark, Hegel criticizes the misuse of formal grounds, claiming that the sciences are basically built upon empty tautologies. Centrifugal force, Hegel states as one of several examples drawn from the physical sciences,
may be given as prime grounds (i.e. "explanation of") some phenomena, but we may later find upon critical examination that this phenomenon supposedly explained by centrifugal force is actually used to infer centrifugal force in the first place. Hegel characterizes this sort of reasoning as a "witch's circle" in which "phenomena and phantoms run riot."

Real ground is external and made up of two substrates, both directly applicable to content (which evidently is what we seem to perceive). The first is the relation between the ground and the grounded and the second substrate handles the diversity of content. As an example Hegel says that an official may hold an office for a variety of reasons—suitable connections, made an appearance on such and such occasion, and so forth. These various factors are the grounds for his holding office. It is real ground that serves to firstly make the connection between holding office and these reasons, and secondly to bind the various reasons, i.e. diverse content, together. Hegel points out that "the door is wide open" to infinite determinations that are external to the thing itself (recall that real ground is external). Potentially any set of reasons could be given for an official to be holding office.

In complete ground, Hegel brings together formal and real ground, now saying that formal ground presupposes real ground and vice versa. Complete ground Hegel says is the "total ground-relation."

Subjective Logic or the Doctrine of the Concept
In the third major piece within the Science of Logic, Hegel introduces his idea of pure concepts within which he extends Kant's basic schemes of judgement and syllogism classification. Hegel shows that the true idea can only be based upon valid reasoning and objectivity. Hegel affirms a conceptual realism in which the pure concepts ground any form of actual beings.

Editions of Science of Logic
 Translated by W. H. Johnston and L. G. Struthers. London: George Allen & Unwin, 1929.
 Translated by Henry S. Macran (Hegel's Logic of World and Idea) (Bk III Pts II, III only). Oxford, Clarendon Press, 1929.
 Translated by A. V. Miller; Foreword by J. N. Findlay. London: G. Allen & Unwin, 1969.
 Translated by George di Giovanni, Cambridge: Cambridge University Press, 2010.

See also
 Abstract particularity

Notes

References

Secondary literature
 Bencivenga, Ermanno. 2000. Hegel's Dialectical Logic. Oxford.
 Burbidge, John W. 1995. On Hegel's Logic. Fragments of a Commentary. Atlantic Highlands, N.J.
 Burbidge, John W. 2006. The Logic of Hegel's Logic. An Introduction. Peterborough, ON.
 Butler, Clark. 1996. Hegel's Logic. Between Dialectic and History. Evanston.
 Carlson, David 2007. A Commentary on Hegel's Science of Logic. New York: Palgrave MacMillan. 978-1403986283
 Di Giovanni, George (ed.). 1990. Essays on Hegel's Logic. Albany: New York State University Press.
 Harris, Errol E. 1983. An Interpretation of the Logic of Hegel. Lanham.
 Harris, William T. 1985. Hegel's Logic: A Book on the Genesis of the Categories of the Mind. A Critical Exposition. Chicago.
 Hartnack, Justus. 1998. An Introduction to Hegel's Logic. Indianapolis: Hackett. 
 Houlgate, Stephen. 2006. The Opening of Hegel's Logic: From Being to Infinity. Purdue: University Press.
 Rinaldi, Giacomo. 1992. A History and Interpretation of the Logic of Hegel. Lewiston: Edwin Mellen Press.
 Roser, Andreas. 2009. Ordnung und Chaos in Hegels Logik. 2 Volumes, New York, Frankfurt, Wien. 
 Trisokkas, Ioannis. 2012. Pyrrhonian Scepticism and Hegel's Theory of Judgement. A Treatise on the Possibility of Scientific Inquiry. Boston: Brill. 
 Winfield, Richard Dien. 2006. From Concept to Objectivity. Thinking Through Hegel's Subjective Logic. Aldershot: Ashgate. .

External links
 Source text (German): Wissenschaft der Logik'' Vol. 1 Vol. 2
 Outline of Hegel's Logic at marxists.org
 Contents of Hegel's Logic at marxists.org
 The Meaning of Hegel's Logic (commentary by Andy Blunden)
 Dunayevskaya: Rough Notes on Hegel's Science of Logic
 Terry Button: Hegel's Logic – A Brief Synopsis
 Lenin: Conspectus of Hegel’s Science of Logic
 Lecture Course in Hegel's Science of Logic – Richard Dien Winfield (Audio)

Works by Georg Wilhelm Friedrich Hegel
Logic literature
Philosophy books
Metaphysics literature